Blackheath (postcode: 2785) is an Australian town located near the highest point of the Blue Mountains, between Katoomba and Mount Victoria in New South Wales.

Blackheath has a vibrant artistic community and hosts two monthly markets – the Blackheath Growers Market and The Blackheath Community Market, as well as annual Christmas markets, antique markets and bimonthly craft markets. The town has many community activities, such as the Blackheath Philosophy Forum, which was founded in 2002 to arrange public discussion forums on philosophy and related topics.

As Blackheath has grown, more and more shops have appeared. Various shops from the late 1800s still stand in Blackheath.

History 

The surrounding areas of Blackheath were thought to be a summer corroboree meeting place for peoples of the Darug, Gundungurra and Wiradjuri nations.

Following European settlement of Australia, the site was originally named Hounslow. After crossing the Blue Mountains in 1815 and returning from Bathurst, Governor Lachlan Macquarie renamed the settlement as "Black-Heath", in reference to the colour and texture of the native shrubbery in the area. Macquarie recorded in his journal: 
"This place having a black wild appearance I have this day named it Black-Heath."

The first building in Blackheath, the "Scotch Thistle Inn", was erected by Andrew Gardner in 1831 and Charles Darwin visited the inn in 1836. The extent of the original grant of land to Gardner can be seen today as the area bound by the Great Western Highway, Govetts Leap Road and (the misspelt) Gardiners Crescent.

Blackheath developed into a town after the Main Western railway line was built in 1869; the current station location was completed in 1883. A large dam built to supply water for railway steam engines became the public baths well before steam operations ceased upon electrification. The baths opened for public swimming in 1931 and since then have been redeveloped to include swimming pools, children's play facilities and surrounding park lands. Blackheath's original post office opened in 1910 and has now been converted into a gift shop and cafe.

Blackheath's sporting claim to fame is that Don Bradman hit a century off three overs for the Blackheath team in November 1931 at Blackheath Oval in a social match against Lithgow. He went on to make 256.

Heritage listings 
Blackheath has a number of heritage listed sites, including:
 Blue Mountains National Park: Blue Mountains walking tracks
 Main Western railway: Blackheath railway station

People
Of these:
 Age distribution: The residents' median age was 51 years, which is thirteen years older than the national median age of 38. Children aged under 15 years made up 15.5% of the population (national average is 18.7%) and people aged 65 years and over made up 26.1% of the population (national average is 15.8%).
  Ethnic diversity: 73.8% of people were born in Australia. The next most common country of birth was England at 6.4%. 88.1% of people only spoke English at home.
 Finances: The median household weekly income was $1,077, compared to the national median of $1,438. This difference is also reflected in real estate, with the median mortgage payment being $1,616 per month, compared to the national median of $1,755.
 Housing: Of occupied private dwellings in Blackheath, 96.3% were separate houses. The average household size was 2.1 people.
 Religion: The most common responses for religion were No Religion 42.8%, Anglican 15.1% and Catholic 14.8%.

Local attractions

Govetts Leap

From Blackheath town centre, a short drive to the east-north-east takes visitors to Govetts Leap, a lookout with views of the Grose Valley and nearby waterfalls. The fall is named after William Romaine Govett, an assistant to the Surveyor General at the time, who first came upon the falls in June 1831. The name 'leap' is an old Scottish word meaning waterfall or cascade.

Evans Lookout

Evans Lookout provides an alternate vantage point for views, also into Grose Valley.

Other lookouts, walking tracks and attractions

Pulpit Rock, Perrys Lookdown, and Anvil Rock are other lookouts to the north-northeast of the town centre, off Hat Hill Road. There are several walking tracks starting from the lookouts, including short walks to enjoy different views, longer half and whole day walks, and walks involving camping overnight or several days' walk. Canyoners and rockclimbers also base themselves at Blackheath for activities in the surrounding national park. The Blue Gum Forest may be accessed from Perrys Lookdown.

The area is known today for its colourful blooms in Spring and golden Autumn foliage as the weather begins to cool. In September, daffodils bloom, and on the first weekend of November, Blackheath hosts an annual Rhododendron Festival.

The Campbell Rhododendron Gardens are located north-north-east of the town centre, in Bachante Street. The  gardens comprise rhododendrons and azaleas planted underneath a native Australian bush canopy tended by the volunteers of The Blue Mountains Rhododendron Society of NSW.

The ornamental cherry trees that line the streets are usually in full bloom in the first week of October.

Mount Boyce lookout is located northwest of Blackheath, towards Lithgow.

Blackheath has a number of cafés and restaurants, a large antique centre, and other shops. It is a common destination for people from Sydney for a weekend excursion or a Sunday drive. Due to the climate, Blackheath is a popular destination for Christmas in July.

Transport

Blackheath was connected to the Main Western railway line in 1869, and the town is now served by the Blackheath railway station located on the Blue Mountains Line.

The Great Western Highway is the main road access route, through the town's main business district. To the northwest of Blackheath, at Mount Victoria, the Darling Causeway connects the Great Western Highway to the Bells Line of Road at Bell.

A big tunnel is being constructed in the Blue Mountains. It will go through Blackheath too. It will be the tallest tunnel in Australia.

On the day of the 2016 Census, the most common methods of travel to work for employed people were: Car, as driver 56.6%, Worked at home 12.7% and Train 5.4%.

Wildlife 

A large amount of wildlife inhabit in and around Blackheath. Mammals such as the Eastern Grey Kangaroo and Echidna live in the forests around Blackheath.

Rare bird species also occur, such as the Lesser Sooty Owl and Regent Honeyeater.

Geography and climate 

The area around Blackheath has views over the Grose Valley from Evans Lookout and Govetts Leap in the east, and the vista of the Megalong Valley from Hargraves Lookout in the west, past the small hamlet of Shipley.

As the highest town in the Blue Mountains, Blackheath receives snow in winter (two settled falls per season is the average with another five to ten days of light snow showers) and even in summer the temperatures are generally mild in comparison to other locations at the same latitude. Average maximum temperature in winter is around  although some days struggle to get above . Frosts are fairly common but not as common or strong as frosts on the Oberon Plateau or in places further west, like Bathurst and Orange. Local topography tends to keep minimum temperatures in the  range as the coldest air during radiative cooling (clear, calm nights) drains into the valleys.

Minimum temperatures in summer are typically around  but minimums in single figures also occur, more commonly in December.

Blackheath's location on a high ridge makes it vulnerable to strong and sometimes destructive winds, especially in the winter months when cold fronts surge up from the Southern Ocean, producing land gales. The Venturi effect, where airflow is constricted by vertical cliffs and deep valleys, would probably have produced winds notably stronger than this in vulnerable locations in town and nearby. Land gales are more likely to occur from around April to November but vary in their intensity from year to year.

Blackheath can also be prone to fogs and thunderstorms, although this varies notably from year to year. Some days in summer are quite humid, allowing for moisture to build during the day, sometimes creating severe storms that can last for hours. The most common cause for quite frequent spring/summer thunderstorms in and around Blackheath is related to the early, mid morning heating of the lower atmosphere, due to the town's elevation.

Blackheath is surrounded by the Blue Mountains National Park which is prone to bushfires. In November 2006 severe bushfires threatened Blackheath from the north.

Blackheath experiences a subtropical highland climate with monthly average temperatures not falling below  and not exceeding .

References

Further reading

External links 

 Blue Mountains city council
 Google Satellite Map of Blackheath
 Blackheath Weather
 Blackheath – VisitNSW.com
  [CC-By-SA]

 
Communities in the Blue Mountains (New South Wales)
Populated places established in 1815
1815 establishments in Australia